In mathematics, a constant term is a term in an algebraic expression that does not contain any variables and therefore is constant.  For example, in the quadratic polynomial

the 3 is a constant term.

After like terms are combined, an algebraic expression will have at most one constant term.  Thus, it is common to speak of the quadratic polynomial

where  is the variable, as having a constant term of   If the constant term is 0, then it will conventionally be omitted when the quadratic is written out.

Any polynomial written in standard form has a unique constant term, which can be considered a coefficient of   In particular, the constant term will always be the lowest degree term of the polynomial.  This also applies to multivariate polynomials. For example, the polynomial

has a constant term of −4, which can be considered to be the coefficient of  where the variables are eliminated by being exponentiated to 0 (any non-zero number exponentiated to 0 becomes 1). For any polynomial, the constant term can be obtained by substituting in 0 instead of each variable; thus, eliminating each variable. The concept of exponentiation to 0 can be applied to power series and other types of series, for example in this power series:

 is the constant term.

Constant of integration

The derivative of a constant term is 0, so when a term containing a constant term is differentiated, the constant term vanishes, regardless of its value. Therefore the antiderivative is only determined up to an unknown constant term, which is called "the constant of integration" and added in symbolic form.

See also
 Constant (mathematics)

References

Polynomials
Elementary algebra